Yenching University was a private research university in Beijing, China, from 1919 to 1952.

The university was formed out of the merger of four Christian colleges between the years 1915 and 1920. The term "Yenching" comes from an alternative name for old Beijing, derived from its status as capital of the state of Yan, one of the seven Warring States that existed until the 3rd century BC.

History
Yenching University was formed through the merger of four Christian schools over the course of five years, from 1915 to 1920:
 Hweiwen University, also known as the Methodist Peking University, founded in 1890 by the Methodist Episcopal Church. This should not be confused with the National Peking University founded eight years later in 1898. Huiwen's precursor (崇內懷理書院) was founded in 1870. Hiram Harrison Lowry was its principal.
 North China Union College in Tongzhou. Its precursor (公理會潞河書院) was founded by the Congregational Church. Devello Z. Sheffield was the school's principal.
North China Union Women's College. Its precursor, Bridgman Academy, was founded in 1864 Eliza J. Bridgman. It would be renamed the North China Union Women's College in 1907, with Luella Miner as its first president. When it joined Yenching University in 1920, it bore the name College of Arts and Sciences for Women of Peking University.
The school of theology was itself a union of the theological seminary of North China Education Union and two Methodist theological schools in Beijing.

John Leighton Stuart was appointed as the principal of the university in January 1919, prior to which he had been teaching Greek at the Jinling Theological Seminary (金陵神學院) in Nanjing. As the university was initially short on funds, he turned to fundraising worldwide and received support from the estate of Charles Martin Hall, an American executive of Alcoa Aluminum. The university bought the royal gardens of a Qing Dynasty prince to build a scenic campus and employed gardeners from the Imperial gardens. In 1926 the campus was completed. Theology, Law, and Medical were the main schools of the university, together with Arts and Science studies.

Stuart determined to create a university that served the Chinese nation. He attracted major Chinese and Western scholars to teach. Religion was not a qualification, although Stuart gave major support to the School of Theology. Among the first was William Hung, who became Chairman of the History Department and Dean. In 1928, the Harvard-Yenching Institute was jointly founded by Yenching University and Harvard University for the teaching of the humanities and social sciences in East Asia.  Under Hung, the university's reputation for Chinese studies rose steadily, especially with the publication of the Harvard-Yenching Sinological Index Series. By 1930, the school was among the top universities in China, its teaching distinguished itself by a considerable academic freedom.

During the Second Sino-Japanese War, the area was occupied by Japan and the university was moved to Chengdu, Sichuan. After the People's Republic of China was established in 1949, Yenching University remained open, although under control of the Chinese Communist Party. In 1952, Mao Zedong's government re-grouped the country's higher education institutions with individual institutions tending to specialize in a certain field of study after the Soviet model. As a result, Yenching University was closed up, and its arts and science faculties were merged into Peking University and other state-operated institutions, its politics and law faculties were merged into China University of Political Science and Law, its economics faculties were merged into Central University of Finance and Economics, its sociology faculties were merged into Minzu University of China, and other faculties merged into other institutions. At the same time, its engineering section was merged with Tsinghua University, and Peking University moved from central downtown Beijing to take over the former Yenching University campus in the city's Haidian District.

Scholars
Among the scholars who taught at Yenching University were:
 Wu Leichuan (theology)
 William Hung (sinologist)
 Zhao Zichen (theology)
 Qian Mu (historian)
 John Stewart Burgess (sociologist)
 Kenneth K.S. Chen (historian of Buddhism)
 Lu Zhiwei (theologian)
 Edgar Snow (journalism)
 Louis Rhys Oxley Bevan (Law)
Luella Miner (dean of the women's college)
Margaret Bailey Speer (dean of the women's college)

Alumni
Prominent alumni include: 
 Fei Xiaotong (anthropologist)
 Han Suyin (author)
 C.K. Yang (anthropologist)
 Bing Xin (Xie Wanying) writer
 Teng Ssu-yu (historian)
 Gong Peng (diplomat)
 Huang Hua (diplomat)
 James Shen (diplomat)
 Larry Wu-tai Chin (double-agent)

See also

 History of Beijing
Michael Lindsay, 2nd Baron Lindsay of Birker and Hsiao Li Lindsay, Baroness Lindsay of Birker

Notes

References
West, Phillip Yenching University and Sino-Western Relations, 1916-1952 (Cambridge: Harvard University Press, 1976).
 Arthur Lewis Rosenbaum.  ed., New Perspectives on Yenching University, 1916-1952 : A Liberal Education for a New China. (Chicago: Imprint Publications,  2012).   . Some of the essays were first published in Journal of American-East Asian Relations 14: 1-4 (2004-2006).

External links
Internet Mission Photography Archive (enter "Yenching University in Search Box)
Photos at the International Mission Photography Archive

 
Defunct universities and colleges in China
Christian schools in China
Educational institutions established in 1870
Educational institutions established in 1919
1919 establishments in China
Traditional Chinese architecture